Joseph Marshall may refer to:
 Joseph Marshall (traveller) (years of birth and death are unknown), British traveler of 2nd half of the 18th century 
 Joseph Marshall (cricketer, born 1835) (1835–1915), English clergyman and cricketer
 Joseph Marshall (sportsman) (1862–1913), English cricketer and footballer
 Joseph Marshall (judge) (died 1847), Irish-born judge and politician in pre-Confederation Nova Scotia
 Joseph Marshall (painter), 18th century English painter
 Kaiser Marshall (Joseph Marshall, 1899–1948), American jazz drummer
 Joe Marshall (musician) (1913–1992), jazz drummer
 Joseph M. Marshall III (born 1946), writer
 Joseph E. Marshall (born 1947), American anti-violence community activist and talk radio host
 Joseph Henry Marshall (1854–1919), farmer and political figure in Ontario, Canada
 Joe Marshall (1876–1931), outfielder in Major League Baseball
 Joseph Herbert Marshall (1851–1918), concert impresario and mayor of Leicester
 Joe Marshall (jockey) (1908–1973), British jockey